The Verdon is a  river in Southeastern France, left tributary of the Durance. The Verdon is best known for its impressive canyon: the Verdon Gorge. The name comes from the green appearance of the waters of the river, in the canyon.

Course
It flows southwest through the following departments and towns:

 Alpes-de-Haute-Provence: Allos, Colmars, Saint-André-les-Alpes, Castellane
 Var: Vinon-sur-Verdon

The Verdon flows through several artificial lakes, before flowing into the river Durance near Vinon-sur-Verdon, south of Manosque.

Its main tributaries are the Artuby, Colostre, Jabron and Issole.

See also
 Lake of Sainte-Croix

References

Rivers of France
Rivers of Alpes-de-Haute-Provence
Rivers of Var (department)
Rivers of Provence-Alpes-Côte d'Azur
Braided rivers in France